Spyridon "Spyros" Panteliadis (alternate spellings: Spiridon, Spyros) ((born January 30, 1977 in Athens, Greece) is a Greek professional basketball player. At 1.91 m (6 ft. 3 in.) tall, he played at the point guard position.

Professional career
Panteliadis started playing basketball with Panionios and he played with them in the Korać Cup in the 1993–94 season. He also loaned to Esperos Kallitheas B.C., during 1996–97 season. His first pro contract started with Maroussi. In the early years of his career, he won the Greek League championship and the Greek Cup with AEK Athens.

He then moved to Ionikos N.F., and then to Spain and Ciudad de Huelva, and then to PAOK. He then moved to the German League club Skyliners. He then played with Aris and Kolossos Rodou. He then played in the Greek minor league divisions with Polis Kallitheas, Kouros Anavissou, and Kronos Geraka.

National team career
Panteliadis was a member of the junior national teams of Greece. With Greece's junior national team, he played at the 1994 FIBA Europe Under-18 Championship.

Awards and accomplishments 
Greek Cup winner: (2001)
Greek League champion: (2002)

External links
FIBA Europe profile
Euroleague.net profile
Eurobasket.com profile

1977 births
Living people
AEK B.C. players
Aris B.C. players
Esperos B.C. players
Greek Basket League players
Greek men's basketball players
Ionikos N.F. B.C. players
Kolossos Rodou B.C. players
Maroussi B.C. players
Panionios B.C. players
P.A.O.K. BC players
Point guards
Skyliners Frankfurt players
Basketball players from Athens